Crazy Women is a 1977 Argentine drama film written by José P. Dominiani and directed by Enrique Carreras. It was entered into the 10th Moscow International Film Festival where Mercedes Carreras won the award for Best Actress.

Cast
Marta Albertini
Virginia Amestoy
Trissi Bauer
Leonor Benedetto
Olinda Bozán
Alicia Bruzzo
Juan Jos Camero
Mercedes Carreras
Marta Cipriano
Luis Corradi
Mara Danelli
Aurora del Mar
Hctor Fuentes
Carlos Luzzieti
Leonor Manso
Nora Massi
Carlos Muoz
Ins Murray

References

External links

WatchAllYouCan: Las Locas page

1977 films
1977 drama films
Argentine drama films
1970s Spanish-language films
1970s Argentine films
Films directed by Enrique Carreras